Antonietta luteorufa is a species of sea slug or aeolid nudibranch, a marine gastropod mollusc in the family Facelinidae.

Distribution
This nudibranch is known from the Gulf of Naples, Italy.

References

Facelinidae
Gastropods described in 1966